Tailevu is one of the 14 provinces of Fiji.

Overview
One of the eight provinces based in Viti Levu, Fiji's largest island, Tailevu's 755 square kilometers occupy the south-eastern fringe of the island along with some central areas. At the 2017 census, it had a population of 64,552, the fifth largest among the provinces.  The main urban area of Tailevu is Nausori with a population of 21,645 in 1996. Tailevu includes the districts of Bau, Nakelo, Verata, Wainibuka, and Sawakasa.  Bau District includes Bau Island, the seat of the Kubuna Confederacy, one of three traditional chiefly hierarchies in Fiji.  Kubuna's Paramount Chief, called the Vunivalu of Bau, is generally considered the most senior such chief in Fiji. The Indigenous Fijians' land, water ways, foreshore, seabed, and fishing grounds is held in perpetuity among other special privileges to which they are entitled.

Notable people
 Frank Bainimarama, prime minister of Fiji since 2007
 Ratu Seru Epenisa Cakobau, warlord who forged the first nation-state out of the Fiji islands
 Ratu George Cakobau, governor-general of Fiji from 1973 to 1983 and great-grandson of Seru Epenisa Cakobau
 Ratu George Cakobau, Jr., politician and son of George Cakobau
 Ratu Jope Seniloli, vice-president of Fiji until 2004
 George Speight, politician who headed the 2000 coup d'état that overthrew Fiji's elected government

References

 
Tailevu
Tailevu